Louis N. James (September 1882 – June 7, 1935) was an American amateur golfer.

1902 U.S. Amateur
James won the 1902 U.S. Amateur at Glen View Club, defeating Eben Byers in the final, 4 and 2. Heavy rain flooded part of the course, and the final four rounds, including the final, were played on the first nine, 36-hole matches requiring four circuits of the first nine. James, whose family lived on the grounds of Glen View, was the first teenager to win the U.S. Amateur, at age 19 years, 10 months.

Death
James died on June 7, 1935, aged 51, in Chicago, Illinois.

References

American male golfers
Amateur golfers
Golfers from Chicago
1882 births
1935 deaths